Nationality words link to articles with information on the nation's poetry or literature (for instance, Irish or France).

Events
 Jacques Testu de Belval elected to the Académie française

Works published

Great Britain
 Charles Cotton, Scarronides; or, Virgile Travestie, published anonymously (see also Scarronides 1664, 1667)
 Edward Herbert, Lord Herbert of Cherbury, Occasional Verses of Edward Lord Herbert, Baron of Cherbury and Castle-Island
 Andrew Marvell, The Character of Holland, published anonymously
 John Phillips, translator, Typhon; or, The Gyants War with the Gods: A mock poem, translated from Paul Scarron
 George Wither:
 Meditations Upon the Lords Prayer
 Three Private Meditations, poetry and prose

Other
 August Buchner (died 1661), Hauptwerk, Anleitung zur deutschen Poeterei ("Instructions for German poetry"), German poet and critic, published in Wittenberg
 Daniel Levi de Barrios, also known as Miguel de Barrios, Flor de Apolo, Jewish Spanish poet living in the Netherlands, published in Brussels
 René Rapin, Hortorum libri IV, Paris; Latin-language poem written in France (translated into English in 1673 and 1706)

Births
Death years link to the corresponding "[year] in poetry" article:
 April 13 - Guillaume Massieu (died 1722), French churchman, translator and poet
 December 6 - Lady Grizel Baillie (died 1746), Scottish songwriter
 Ebenezer Cooke (also spelled "Cook"; died 1732), English Colonial American poet
 William Hamilton (died 1751), Scottish poet

Deaths
Birth years link to the corresponding "[year] in poetry" article:
 March 7 - Guillaume Bautru (born 1588), French satirical poet and a founder member of the Académie française
 April 15 - Lorenzo Lippi (born 1606), Italian painter and poet
 November 17 - John Earle (born 1601), English bishop, writer and poet
 Samuel Coster (born 1579), Dutch playwright and poet

See also

 Poetry
 17th century in poetry
 17th century in literature
 Restoration literature

References

17th-century poetry
Poetry